Richard Salisbury may refer to:
 Richard Anthony Salisbury, British botanist
 Richard Frank Salisbury, Canadian anthropologist